Robert Winter Le Sueur, MBE (3 October 1920 – 5 November 2022) was a British humanitarian. A resident of Jersey, he was awarded an MBE for his efforts in assisting escaped Russian prisoners, in Jersey, during the Nazi Occupation of the Channel Islands.

During the Occupation, Le Sueur was able to move about due to his work as an insurance agent. He acted as relay in a network of people sheltering escapees: from 1942 he handled eight or nine escapees. After the war he was a teacher of English and foreign languages.

He was appointed a Member of the Order of the British Empire (MBE) in the 2013 Birthday Honours "for services to the community."

Portrait
A 2007 portrait of Le Sueur, by artist Stephen Shankland, is held by the Jersey Museum and Art Gallery.

Personal life and death
Le Sueur died at his home on 5 November 2022, at the age of 102.

References

External links

 An account on Russian slaves in Jersey by Le Sueur
 An interview with Le Sueur

1920 births
2022 deaths
British centenarians
Jersey people
Members of the Order of the British Empire
Men centenarians
British humanitarians